Hotch Potch House is a 1996 BBC television series aimed at preschool children. It stars Richard Coombs as Raggs, Francis Wright (Art Attack) as Shelley and Rebecca Nagan (Rosie and Jim) as Woolie. It was directed by Vivienne Cozens and shot at Grip House Studios. The stated aim is to "have the puppets teach children about their emotions and feelings in a way that relates to them." The show features puppetry, animation and live-action scenes.

Format
A recycled homemade model house, known as "Hotch Potch House", hence the name, spins round once and the camera focuses on a different bit of it which indicates something.
 Eye – Eyewitness
A bit on the model Hotch Potch House that looks like an eye gives a wink.

 Front Door – Letter of the Week (a b c d e f)
The first six letters of the alphabet pop out through the letter box of the front door. The chosen letter turns white, flies off and lands somewhere else in a cutout animation becoming enormous at the same time.

 Chimney – Number of the Week (1 2 3 4 5)
The numbers 1 to 5 pop out of the chimney and fly up into the sky, lining themselves up. The chosen number turns white and lands somewhere else in a cutout animation becoming enormous at the same time. Then a group of living fruit and vegetables from a basket in the kitchen goes into the cupboard to perform a number song inside it.

 Tree – Activities
The tree magically grows.

 Window – Songs and Rhymes
The window opens and musical notes pop out through it.

 Garden Door – Out and About
The garden door opens.

The Mouse House
There is also a special storytime called The Mouse House about five mice whose names are Kevin, Max, Betsey, Lester and Primrose who all live together in a little house behind a tiny brown door next to Nana who tells the stories. Each story starts with Nana's special introduction.

"Find a comfy place to sit, as quiet as a mouse, and listen to a story about a little house. Just in the corner, down by the floor, in Hotch Potch House there's a tiny brown door. Push the door open and step right through - inside the Mouse House there's a story for you!"

Episodes

Credits

In the Mouse House
 Nana's Voice – Tina Gray
 Animation – Ealing Animation (El Nombre)
 Kevin – James Danaher
 Max – Dexter Koh
 Betsey – Ashlie Walker
 Lester – Tom Fletcher
 Primrose – Lily Cole

Letter / Number of the Week
 Animation – Alan Rogers and Peter Lang (Pigeon Street)
 Number Song – Steve Brown

Music
 Paddy Kingsland 
 Stephen McNeff  
 Sandy Nuttgens (The Mouse House)

References

External links

http://www.franciswright.wordpress.com

1996 British television series debuts
1996 British television series endings
BBC children's television shows
British children's television series
British preschool education television series
British television shows featuring puppetry
British television shows for schools
Animated television series about mice and rats
English-language television shows
1990s British children's television series
British television series with live action and animation
Reading and literacy television series
Mathematics education television series
Mathematics education in the United Kingdom